Cheia Monastery — a Romanian Orthodox complex located on the right bank of Tâmpa Creek, southeast of Cheia village (itself part of Măneciu commune), in Prahova County, Wallachia region, southeastern Romania.  The monastery of monks was dedicated to the Holy Trinity.

History
Cheia Monastery was originally built out of wood, in 1770. It was 
destroyed by the Ottomans in 1777. A new wooden church was built in the early 1800s, but it was ravaged by fire 30 years later. The current monastery church was built of stone between 1835 and 1839. The murals were painted by Gheorghe Tattarescu in 1837.

The monastery suffered during World War I, when German troops occupied the grounds and destroyed some of the  buildings. In 1950, the Communist authorities forced the bishop of Oradea,  into exile at Cheia Monastery, where he died in 1960.

References

External links

Buildings and structures completed in 1839
Romanian Orthodox monasteries of Prahova County
Historic monuments in Prahova County